Gangdong Station (강동역, 江東驛, river east station) is a station on Seoul Subway Line 5. The line branches off to the northeast and the southeast at this point, with Gil-dong station to the northeast and Dunchon-dong station to the southeast. Cheonho station precedes it on the west.

Station layout

References 

Railway stations opened in 1995
Seoul Metropolitan Subway stations
Metro stations in Gangdong District